Elachista talgarella is a moth of the family Elachistidae, which is commonly found in southern Kazakhstan.

References

talgarella
Moths described in 1992
Moths of Asia